Richard Tyler (born September 22, 1947) is a fashion designer. He was born in the suburb of Sunshine in Melbourne (Australia) and now resides in Los Angeles, California and New York City. He has received great acclaim for dressing Hollywood celebrities.

Joan Lunden made an episode in her program Behind Closed Doors about him .

He is the man responsible for designing Delta Air Lines' uniforms in 2005.

Part of his runway is shown in the 2001 movie Head over Heels.

In 2006, Tyler appeared as guest judge on the reality television program Project Runway.

References

External links

 Richard Tyler New York Magazine
 The Wearing and Tearing of Richard Tyler  Los Angeles Times, February 26, 2006

Australian fashion designers
1947 births
Living people
People from Sunshine, Victoria
Artists from Melbourne
Australian emigrants to the United States